Taungdwingyi is a town located in Magway Region, Myanmar.

Town scape

The town is divided into ten main quarters. They are Ohndaw Quarter 1, Ohndaw Quarter 2, Taungbyin Quarter 1, Taungbyin Quarter 2, Shwe-oh Quarter 1, Shwe-oh Quarter 2, Maungdaing Quarter 1, Maungdaing Quarter 2, Shwe Kya-in Quarter 1 and Shwe Kya-in Quarter 2. At the center of the town are the Myoma Zay central market, and the Independence Park. The Kandawgyi Lake, which used to be a weir in ancient times, is located on the east side, and is ringed by a number of historic Buddhist monasteries. Zeya Mingala Shweindaung is the most sacred pagoda in the township. The Aung Myin Zeya Rakhine Pagoda located at the western part of the town is the largest pagoda in the township. Once, it was in a state of decay and renovation was finished in 2013.

Economy
Economic of this town is based on agriculture and trading agricultural products. Onion, rice, beans, grains, and sugarcane are grown. Peanut oil is also a major product of the town.

Transportation
Taungdwingyi is connected to Magway to the West, Pyay to the South and Naypyidaw to the East, by means of territorial roads and railways. The closest major airport is the Magway Airport (MWQ).

History
The Taungdwingyi region is one of the earliest inhabited regions in Myanmar. The Pyu city of Beikthano was founded around 200 BCE. In 1278, a member of the Pagan royalty, Thihapate reestablished Taungdwingyi. In 1480, King Minkhaung II sent Lord Zeya Kyawhtin to administer the town. During the Ava period (1364–1555), the region produced a number of famous poets and writers such as Shin Ohnnyo, Shin Khayma, Shin Uttama and Shin Maha Thilawuntha, Shin Nyeinme and Khingyi Phyaw.

Weather
Temperatures drop sharply at night. January is on average the month with most sunshine. The wet season has a rainfall peak around August, the dry season is around the month of March.

Nature
Taungdwingyi has a humid (> 0.65 p/pet) climate. The climate is classified as a tropical monsoon (short dry season, monsoon rains other months), with a subtropical dry forest biozone . The soil in the area is high in nitosols, andosols (nt), soil with deep, clay-enriched lower horizon with shiny ped surfaces.

Gallery

See also
Taungdwingyi Cultural Museum

References

Populated places in Magway Region
Township capitals of Myanmar